Veselava Parish is an administrative unit of Cēsis Municipality in the Vidzeme region of Latvia.

Towns, villages and settlements of Veselava Parish 
  - parish administrative center
 Bērzkrogs - town
 Pauļi - village
 Mežgaļi - village
 Stirnas - village
 Zeikariv - village

References 

Parishes of Latvia
Cēsis Municipality
Vidzeme